Hyalopeza schneiderae is a species of tephritid or fruit flies in the genus Hyalopeza of the family Tephritidae.

Distribution
Australia.

References

Tephritinae
Insects described in 1957
Diptera of Australasia